Moritz Plafky (born 10 April 1996 in Siegburg) is a German judoka.

He was one of the bronze medalist at the 2018 Judo Grand Prix Tashkent and is bound to represent Germany at the 2020 Summer Olympics.

References

External links
 

1996 births
Living people
German male judoka
Judoka at the 2019 European Games
European Games competitors for Germany
Judoka at the 2020 Summer Olympics
Olympic judoka of Germany
People from Siegburg
Sportspeople from Cologne (region)